Pheasant shooting is the activity of shooting the common pheasant. It takes place in the United Kingdom, and is practised in other parts of the world. Shooting of game birds is carried out using a shotgun, often 12 and 20 bore or a .410, sometimes on land managed by a gamekeeper.

United Kingdom 
The common pheasant was first introduced to Great Britain many centuries ago, but was rediscovered as a game bird in the 1830s. It is reared extensively in captivity, and around 47 million pheasants are released each year on shooting estates, mainly in England, although most released birds survive less than a year in the wild.

The numbers of captive-reared pheasants released have risen sharply since the 1980s. Natural England has concluded that the released birds threaten native wildlife by increasing predator numbers and creating competition for food.  In October 2020 the Department for Environment, Food and Rural Affairs (Defra) announced that a licensing regime would be introduced in 2021 for releases of pheasants within 500m of protected sites.

Pheasants are shot on the traditional formal "driven shoot" principles, whereby guest or paying guns have birds driven over them by beaters, and on smaller "rough shoots" by other methods. The open season in the UK is from 1 October to 1 February, under the Game Act 1831. Generally they are shot by guns employing gun dogs to help find, flush, and retrieve shot birds. Retrievers, spaniels, and pointing breeds are used to flush pheasants.

The doggerel "Up gets a guinea, bang goes a penny-halfpenny, and down comes a half a crown" reflects the expensive pastime of 19th century driven shoots in Britain, when pheasants were often shot for pleasure rather than as food. It was a popular royal pastime in Britain to shoot common pheasants. King George V shot over a thousand pheasants out of a total bag of 3,937 over a six-day period in December 1913 during a competition with a friend, however did not do enough to beat him.

United States 
Common pheasants were introduced in North America in 1773 and have become well established throughout much of the Rocky Mountain states (Colorado, Montana, Wyoming, etc.), the Midwest, the Plains states, as well as Canada and Mexico. It is now most common on the Great Plains.

In some states, e.g. Ohio, captive-reared and released birds make up much of the population. The first planted pheasants in the United States were put in the Willamette Valley in Oregon.

Pheasant hunting is popular in much of the U.S., especially in the Great Plains states, where a mix of farmland and native grasslands provides ideal habitat. South Dakota alone has an annual harvest of over a million birds by over 200,000 hunters.

Much of the American hunting is done by groups of hunters, who walk through fields and shoot the birds as they are flushed by dogs such as Labrador Retrievers and Springer Spaniels. There are also many hunters who use Pointers such as English Setters or German Shorthairs to find and hold pheasants for hunters to flush and shoot.

References

External links 

Bird hunting
Hunting and shooting in the United Kingdom
Pheasants
Hunting in the United States